Douglas Braidwood Gibbon (8 January 1913 – 20 September 1962) was a South African cricket umpire. He stood in one Test match, South Africa vs. New Zealand, at Port Elizabeth 16-20 February 1962.

See also
 List of Test cricket umpires

References

1913 births
1962 deaths
Place of birth missing
South African Test cricket umpires